Fairoz Nuruddin Saith is an Indian Politician and who served as the Member of the Legislative Assembly for the Belgaum Uttar constituency from 2008 to 2018. He is member of the Indian National Congress.

References

External links 
Fairoz Nuruddin Saith affidavit

Living people
Karnataka MLAs 2013–2018
Indian National Congress politicians from Karnataka
1952 births